Apodemia hepburni, or Hepburn's metalmark, is a species of metalmark in the family of butterflies known as Riodinidae. It is found in North America.

The MONA or Hodges number for Apodemia hepburni is 4404.

References

Further reading

 

Apodemia
Articles created by Qbugbot
Butterflies described in 1886